Ove Bjelke (26 October 1611 – 29 March 1674) was a Norwegian nobleman,  feudal lord and statesman. He served as  Chancellor of Norway (1660–1674).

Biography

He was born in Trondheim; the son of Jens Bjelke (1580–1659) and Sophie Brockenhuus (1587-1656). He was the brother of Henrik Bjelke (1615-1683) and Jørgen Bjelke (1621-1696), both of whom also held prominent positions.

He grew up in a rich and cultured environment. He was educated at the University of Padua in Padua, Italy. His father held the office of Chancellor of Norway from 1614. When his father died in 1659, he took over several of his properties including Austrått manor in Sør-Trøndelag.  Much of the manor as it stands today is the result of his efforts.  He also served as Chancellor of Norway from 1660. In 1666 he was transferred as staple commander from Bergen to Trondheim. He was a signatory of the 1661 Sovereignty Act (Enevoldsarveregjeringsakten), the new constitution of Denmark-Norway, as one of the representatives of the noble estate.

Personal life
Ove Bjelke was married three times; first time in 1643 with Maren Juel (died 1644), the second time in 1647 with Regitze Geddes (1629-1657), the third time in 1660 with Hedvig Lindenow (1635-1678). He was the father of several daughters.

References

Other sources
Andersen. Håkon A. (1992)  Austrått (Trondheim: Nordenfjeldske Kunstindustrimuseum)   
Welle-Strand, Erling (1974) Museums in Norway (Oslo: Royal Ministry of Foreign Affairs)  

1611 births
1674 deaths
People from Trondheim
Norwegian civil servants
17th-century Norwegian nobility
Chancellors of Norway
Signatories of the Sovereignty Act
County governors of Norway
O